This is a list of the 103 MPs who were elected for Irish seats at the 1910 United Kingdom general election (December).

Election result (Ireland only)

Members by constituency

Membership changes

Below is a list of seats which changed parties in by-elections held between this general election and the next.

†Denotes members who Died in Office.

‡Denotes members who was appointed to the office of the Crown Steward and Bailiff of the three Chiltern Hundreds of Stoke, Desborough and Burnham.

‡‡Denotes members who was appointed to the office of the Crown Steward and Bailiff of the Manor of Northstead.

References

1910 in Ireland
General election, 1910, 12, list, Ireland
History of Ireland (1801–1923)